An aviator badge is an insignia used in most of the world's militaries to designate those who have received training and qualification in military aviation.  Also known as a Pilot's Badge, or Pilot Wings, the Aviator Badge was first conceived to recognize the training that military aviators receive, as well as provide a means to outwardly differentiate between military pilots and the “foot soldiers” of the regular ground forces.

Belgium

The current aviator badge of the Belgian Air Force depicting the Leo Belgicus and surmounted the Royal Crown of Belgium.

Bangladesh

Aviator badge of the Bangladesh Air Force

The Aviator Badge of Bangladesh Air Force closely resembles the pilots flying badge of The Royal Air Force. Though the badge has a touch of its own characteristics.

Canada
The Pilot Flying Badge of the Royal Canadian Air Force is:

China
The emblem of the People's Liberation Army Air Force is:

Denmark

The aviator badge of the Royal Danish Air Force is based on the national coat of arms of Denmark.

France

The aviator badges of the French Air Force/Armée de l'air française and French Navy/Force maritime de l'aéronautique navale are:

Germany

1913-1920
Several badges were donated to German aircrew prior, during or after the First World War. The most notable were: 
The Military Pilot Badge was donated on January 27, 1913 by Emperor Wilhelm II. It could be awarded to officers, NCOs and crews who, after completing the two required tests for pilots and after completing their training at a military air base, acquired the certificate as a military pilot issued by the military air and land transportation inspection (Inspektion des Militär-Luft- und Kraft-Fahrtwesens). A similar badge for military pilots was donated on 4 February 1913 by Prince Ludwig from Bavaria.

The badge for navy pilots on seaplanes (Abzeichen für Marine Flugzeugführer auf Seeflugzeugen) was donated on 31 May 1913 by King and Emperor Wilhelm II, for all officers and soldiers, who successfully completed the training on a naval aircraft station and thus received a certificate of qualification as a naval pilot.

The badge for navy pilots on land planes (Abzeichen für Marine Flugzeugführer auf Landflugzeugen) was donated on 23 February 1915 by emperor Wilhelm II for pilots of the Navy, who completed their service in the war on land planes.

The badge for observation officers from airplanes (Abzeichen für Beobachtungsoffiziere aus Flugzeugen) was donated on January 27, 1914 by emperor Wilhelm II. Prerequisites for the award were: 1. a distance traveled of at least 1000 km in an aircraft, 2. a successfully completed technical assistance examination on an aircraft, 3. pass of at least one retake, 4. accomplished exploration missions, and 5. a certification as an observation officer. A similar badge was donated by King Ludwig III. on 3 March 1914 for the Bavarian army.

The airgunner badge (Abzeichen Flugzeug-Fliegerschützen) was founded on January 27, 1918 by emperor Wilhelm II. The soldiers had to demonstrate in-depth knowledge in engine construction and operation, in flight training, in map reading, in the tactics of aerial combat, in theory of bombing, and skills in the operation of machine guns on the ground and in aerial combat.

The commemorative badge for airship crews (Erinnerungsabzeichen für Besatzungen der Luftschiffe) was donated in 1920 by Reichswehr Minister Otto Gessler. There were two versions for Army and Navy airships. Upon request, it was awarded to officers, deck officers, NCOs and crews of former airship crews, who during the war had at least one year of activity on front aircraft.

1935-1945

The Pilotenabzeichen (Pilot's Badge) of the former Luftwaffe had been instituted by Hermann Göring on 12 August 1935. It came in distinct types; nickel silver (changed to zinc during the war) and a variant made of gold. It depicts a silver eagle perched atop a swastika, wings open in a landing pose, and surrounded by a wreath with laurel on the right side and oak branches on the left side, respectively. It was worn in the center of the left breast pocket of the service tunic, underneath the Iron Cross 1st Class if awarded. The badge was awarded after one completed flight training and the flying licence and citation were received.

After 1955

In the Bundeswehr the aviation badge (Tätigkeitsabzeichen Militärluftfahrzeugführer) comes in three grades: bronze (Standard Pilot), silver (Senior Pilot) after 1200 flight hours and gold (Command Pilot) after 1800 flight hours. It depicts the Bundesadler surrounded by an oak leaf wreath between two wings. It is worn above the right breast pocket. A total of two Tätigkeitsabzeichen may be worn, one of which can be foreign in which case the foreign one would be worn below the German one.

Hungary

1938-1945
Pilots and navigators of the Royal Hungarian Air Force wore their aviator rating badge sewn on their uniforms right breast above the pocketflap. The Observers Badge was the same, except without the Holy Crown of Hungary. A smaller version of the pilot's badge which was worn on the lower left sleeve of the overcoat - observers also worn a small insignia without the crown on their sleeve.
During World War II a gilded bronze pilot and observer badge was also introduced.

After 1990
After the withdrawal of Soviet forces from Hungary a new Hungarian Air Force was created. It took on the traditions of the Royal Hungarian Air Force.
There are 4 classes of pilots badges. Gold laurel 1st class aviator; 1st class aviator, 2nd class aviator, and 3rd class aviator.

Israel
The current aviator badges ("wings") in the Israel Air Force is:

Namibia
The aviator badge of the Namibian Air Force is ...

The Netherlands
The aviator badge of the Royal Netherlands Air Force and the Royal Netherlands Navy is

Poland

South Africa
The current aviator badge of the South African Air Force has been in use since 2002, when South Africa adopted a new coat of arms. Like the RAF, the SAAF also has a half-wing version of the badge, in this case for navigators. The aviator and navigator badges comes in three grades: bronze, silver and gold. Reserve force aviator badges have a light blue inlay around the coat of arms as appose to the dark blue of permanent air force aviators.

Spain

Turkey

United Kingdom

The current aviator badge of the Royal Air Force has been in use since the Second World War.  The badge consists of a winged crown and wreath, beneath which are the letters "RAF".  The Royal Air Force also uses a "half wing" version to denote Weapon System Officers (WSOs) and Weapon System Operators (WSOps) as well as various airborne roles such as Airborne Technician.

United States
A Military Aviator badge existed from 1912-17 before being replaced by the predecessor of the "wings" badge.

Notes

References

Military awards and decorations of Nazi Germany
Military aviation
Military specialty insignia